Brent "Koko" Kosolofski (born 22 August 1964) is a Canadian former professional boxer who competed from 1990 to 1996. As an amateur, he represented Canada at the 1988 Summer Olympics.

Career
Competing at light heavyweight as an amateur, Kosolofski represented Canada at the 1986 World Championships in Reno, Nevada, United States, losing to John Beckles of England. He won the bronze medal at the 1986 Commonwealth Games, in Edinburgh, Scotland, losing to eventual gold medal winner James Moran. At the 1988 Summer Olympics in Seoul, South Korea, he lost to Andrea Magi of Italy.

As a professional Kosolofski won the Commonwealth light heavyweight title.

References

External links
 

1964 births
Boxers at the 1986 Commonwealth Games
Commonwealth Games bronze medallists for Canada
Boxers at the 1987 Pan American Games
Pan American Games competitors for Canada
Boxers at the 1988 Summer Olympics
Cruiserweight boxers
Heavyweight boxers
Light-heavyweight boxers
Living people
Olympic boxers of Canada
Sportspeople from Red Deer, Alberta
Canadian male boxers
Commonwealth Games medallists in boxing
Sportspeople from Calgary
Medallists at the 1986 Commonwealth Games